Alhassan Wayo Seini (born 12 September 1945) is a Ghanaian politician and a former member of parliament for the 4th parliament of the 4th republic of Ghana.

Early life and education 
Wayo was born and raised in Tamale. He has a background in Agricultural Science and also holds a bachelor of Science degree from the Kwame Nkrumah University of Science and Technology.

Career 
Wayo is an animal husbandry officer and was a former member of parliament for Tamale Central Constituency in the Northern Region of Ghana between 2005 and 2009.

Politics 
Wayo was first elected into the Ghanaian parliament on the ticket of the National Democratic Congress (NDC) during the 2004 Ghanaian general elections as the member of parliament for  Tamale Central Constituency. He won by 35,635 votes, representing 58.2 percent out of the total 61,271 valid votes cast. He later quit the NDC and stood as an independent candidate but lost to Inusah Fuseini, who represented the NDC in the 2008 general elections.

Personal life 
He is a Muslim.

References 

Living people
1945 births
Ghanaian Muslims
People from Northern Region (Ghana)
Kwame Nkrumah University of Science and Technology alumni
Ghanaian MPs 2005–2009
Tamale Senior High School alumni